Christopher Darby Griffith (1804-1885) was a British politician.

He was a Member of the Parliament of the United Kingdom for Devizes 1857–1868.

References

1804 births
1885 deaths
UK MPs 1857–1859
UK MPs 1859–1865
UK MPs 1865–1868
Members of the Parliament of the United Kingdom for English constituencies
Place of birth missing
Place of death missing